Richard Campeau (born February 12, 1954) is a Canadian politician, who was elected to the National Assembly of Quebec in the 2018 provincial election. He represented the electoral district of Bourget as a member of the Coalition Avenir Québec until the 2022 election, where he was defeated by Parti Québecois leader Paul St-Pierre Plamondon.

Electoral record 

|}

|}

References

Living people
Coalition Avenir Québec MNAs
21st-century Canadian politicians
Politicians from Montreal
1954 births